Sultan of Pahang is the title of the hereditary constitutional head of Pahang, Malaysia. The current sultan is Al-Sultan Abdullah ibni Sultan Ahmad Shah. He is the Head of Islam in the state and the source of all titles, honours and dignities in the state. Historically, the title was also used by rulers of the Old Pahang Sultanate.

History
The Old Pahang Kingdom appeared in foreign records from as early as 5th century and at its height, covered much of the modern state of Pahang and the entire southerly part of the peninsula. Throughout its pre-Melakan history, Pahang was established as a mueang or naksat of some major regional Malayic mandalas including Langkasuka, Srivijaya and Ligor. Around the middle of the 15th century, it was brought into the orbit of Melaka Sultanate and subsequently established as a vassal Muslim Sultanate in 1470, following the coronation of the grandson of the former Maharaja as the first Sultan of Pahang.

Over the years, Pahang grew independent from Melakan control and at one point even established itself as a rival state to Melaka until the latter's demise in 1511. At the height of its influence, the Sultanate was an important power in Southeast Asian history and controlled the entire Pahang basin, bordering to the north, the Pattani Sultanate, and adjoins to that of Johor Sultanate to the south. To the west, it also extends jurisdiction over part of modern-day Selangor and Negeri Sembilan. During this period, Pahang was heavily involved in attempts to rid the Peninsula of the various foreign imperial powers; Portugal, Holland and Aceh. After a period of Acehnese raids in the early 17th century, Pahang entered into the amalgamation with the successor of Melaka, Johor, when its 14th Sultan, Abdul Jalil Shah III, was also crowned the 7th Sultan of Johor. After a period of union with Johor, it was eventually revived as a modern sovereign Sultanate in the late 19th century by the Bendahara dynasty.

After a period of union with Johor, the autonomous Pahang Kingdom came into existence with the consolidation of power by the Bendahara family, following the gradual dismemberment of Johor Empire. A self rule was established in Pahang in the late 18th century, with Tun Abdul Majid declared as the first Raja Bendahara. The area around Pahang formed a part of the hereditary domains attached to this title and administered directly by the Raja Bendahara. The weakening of the Johor sultanate and the disputed succession to the throne was matched by an increasing independence of the great territorial magnates; the Bendahara in Pahang, the Temenggong in Johor and Singapore, and the Yamtuan Muda in Riau.

In 1853, the fourth Raja Bendahara Tun Ali, renounced his allegiance to the Sultan of Johor and became independent ruler of Pahang. He was able to maintain peace and stability during his reign, but his death in 1857 precipitated civil war between his sons. The younger son Wan Ahmad challenged the succession of his half-brother Tun Mutahir, in a dispute that escalated into a civil war. Supported by the neighbouring Terengganu Sultanate and the Siamese, Wan Ahmad emerged victorious, establishing controls over important towns and expelled his brother in 1863. He served as the last Raja Bendahara, and was proclaimed Sultan of Pahang by his chiefs in 1881.

List of rulers

House of Melaka

Sultan of Pahang
1470–1475: Muhammad Shah
1475–1495: Ahmad Shah
1495–1512: Abdul Jamil Shah reign jointly with Mansur Shah I
1495–1519: Mansur Shah I reign jointly with Abdul Jamil Shah
1519–1530: Mahmud Shah
1530–1540: Muzaffar Shah
1540–1555: Zainal Abidin Shah 
1555–1560: Mansur Shah II
1560–1575: Abdul Jamal Shah reign jointly with Abdul Kadir Alauddin Shah
1560–1590: Abdul Kadir Alauddin Shah reign jointly with Abdul Jamal Shah
1590–1592: Ahmad Shah II
1592–1614: Abdul Ghafur Muhiuddin Shah
1614–1615: Alauddin Riayat Shah
1615–1617: Abdul Jalil Shah III first time
1617–1623: Interregnum

Sultan of Johor-Pahang-Riau-Lingga (Johor Empire)
From 1623, Pahang was nominally merged with Johor when Johor's Sultan Abdullah Ma'ayat Shah died and Raja Bujang emerged as the new ruler of Johor-Pahang. Installed as Abdul Jalil Riayat Shah III, he reigned until 1677. With the decline of Aceh, Johor-Pahang gradually extend its suzerainty over the Riau-Lingga islands.

1623–1677: Abdul Jalil Shah III
1641–1676: Yamtuan Muda Raja Bajau – heir apparent to the Johor throne who ruled Pahang as separate dominion until his death in 1676. 
1677–1685: Ibrahim Shah
1685–1699: Mahmud Shah II

House of Bendahara

Sultan of Johor-Pahang-Riau-Lingga (Johor Empire)
When Mahmud Shah II died in 1699, Bendahara Tun Abdul Jalil became Sultan of Johor-Pahang-Riau-Lingga and assumed the title Sultan Abdul Jalil Shah IV. His appointment was accepted by Johor chiefs based on an understanding that the Bendahara would succeed to the throne if the Sultan died without heirs.

1699–1720: Abdul Jalil Shah IV (Bendahara Tun Abdul Jalil)
1722–1760: Sulaiman Badrul Alam Shah
1760–1761: Abdul Jalil Muazzam Shah
1761-1761: Ahmad Riayat Shah
1761–1770: Mahmud Shah III

Raja Bendahara of Pahang
By the early 19th century, the Johor-Pahang-Riau-Lingga empire had begun to break up. After 1806, the empire's constituent parts effectively became principalities, and the cultural unity that had hitherto existed between the Malay Peninsula and the islands of Riau-Lingga was gradually destroyed. The signing of Anglo-Dutch Treaty in 1824 further undermined the cohesion of the Johor-Pahang-Riau-Lingga empire and contributed to the emergence of Pahang and Johor as independent states. The Treaty confirmed, among other things, that the islands south of Singapore, including Java and Sumatra, were to remain the preserve of the Dutch, while the Peninsula would be within the British sphere of influence. The Malay Rulers were not consulted about the Treaty, and the Johor-Pahang-Riau-Lingga empire became irrevocably divided when a succession dispute gave rise to two centres of power, one in Riau-Lingga (under Abdul Rahman Muazzam Shah, r. 1812–1832) and the other in Johor (under Hussein Shah, r.1819–1835).

From here, the Raja Bendahara of Pahang grew increasingly independent. While Bendahara Tun Ali had acknowledged Abdul Rahman as his overlord, the Anglo-Dutch Treaty confined the Sultan to Riau-Lingga, where he was deemed a vassal of the Dutch, and prevented him from exercising his control over the Malay Peninsula, which had come under the British. Bendahara Tun Ali declared his autonomy from the empire by 1853. He was able to maintain peace and stability during his reign, but his death in 1858 precipitated civil war among his sons, Tun Mutahir and Tun Ahmad, the result of which the formation of modern Pahang Sultanate.

1770–1802: Tun Abdul Majid 
1802–1803: Tun Muhammad
1803–1806: Tun Koris 
1806–1858: Tun Ali
1858–1863: Tun Mutahir 
1863–1881: Tun Ahmad later proclaimed as Sultan

Sultan of Modern Pahang
1881–1914: Ahmad al-Mu’azzam Shah
1914–1917: Mahmud Shah
1917–1932: Abdullah al-Mu’tassim Billah Shah
1932–1974: Abu Bakar Ri’ayatuddin al-Mu’azzam Shah
1974–2019: Ahmad Shah Al-Musta’in Billah. Sultan Ahmad abdicated in ill health after Muhammad V of Kelantan abdicated as King of Malaysia on 6 January 2019, allowing his son to become Sultan of Pahang and thus King of Malaysia.
2019–present: Abdullah Ri’ayatuddin Al-Mustafa Billah Shah. Sultan Abdullah became King of Malaysia on 31 January 2019, shortly after he replaced his father as Sultan of Pahang on 15 January.

Family tree

See also
Pahang
Family tree of Malaysian monarchs

References

Bibliography
 
 
 
 
 
 

 
Pahang
History of Pahang
1470 establishments in Asia
1881 establishments in Asia
1880s establishments in British Malaya
Federated Malay States people
People from British Malaya
19th-century monarchs in Asia
20th-century Malaysian politicians